Tuszyn may refer to the following places in Poland:
Tuszyn, a town in Łódź East County, Łódź Voivodeship
Tuszyn, Lower Silesian Voivodeship (south-west Poland)
Tuszyn, Pajęczno County in Łódź Voivodeship (central Poland)